Burlington is a town in Penobscot County, Maine, United States. It is part of the Bangor Metropolitan Statistical Area. The population was 373 at the 2020 census.

History
The area was originally known as "Hurd's Ridge," named after the first non-native settler, Tristram Hurd who arrived in 1824. The town of Burlington was incorporated March 8, 1832.

Geography

Demographics

2010 census
As of the census of 2010, there were 363 people, 166 households, and 106 families living in the town. The racial makeup of the town was 99.4% White, 0.3% Asian, and 0.3% from two or more races. Hispanic or Latino of any race were 0.3% of the population.

There were 166 households, of which 19.9% had children under the age of 18 living with them, 54.8% were married couples living together, 6.6% had a female householder with no husband present, 2.4% had a male householder with no wife present, and 36.1% were non-families. 28.3% of all households were made up of individuals, and 15% had someone living alone who was 65 years of age or older. The average household size was 2.19 and the average family size was 2.61.

The median age in the town was 50 years. 17.9% of residents were under the age of 18; 4.4% were between the ages of 18 and 24; 20.7% were from 25 to 44; 37.3% were from 45 to 64; and 19.8% were 65 years of age or older. The gender makeup of the town was 50.4% male and 49.6% female.

2000 census
As of the census of 2000, there were 351 people, 140 households, and 100 families living in the town.  The population density was 6.5 people per square mile (2.5/km2).  There were 308 housing units at an average density of 5.7 per square mile (2.2/km2).  The racial makeup of the town was 100.00% White. Hispanic or Latino of any race were 0.57% of the population.

There were 140 households, out of which 29.3% had children under the age of 18 living with them, 63.6% were married couples living together, 5.7% had a female householder with no husband present, and 27.9% were non-families. 21.4% of all households were made up of individuals, and 7.1% had someone living alone who was 65 years of age or older.  The average household size was 2.51 and the average family size was 2.91.

In the town, the population was spread out, with 21.1% under the age of 18, 10.0% from 18 to 24, 25.9% from 25 to 44, 26.5% from 45 to 64, and 16.5% who were 65 years of age or older.  The median age was 42 years. For every 100 females, there were 105.3 males.  For every 100 females age 18 and over, there were 108.3 males.

The median income for a household for females. The per capita income for the town was $11,573.  About 6.5% of families and 10.9% of the population were below the poverty line, including 2.3% of those under age 18 and 3.1% of those age 65 or over.

See also
 School Administrative Unit 31

References

Alan H. Hawkins. History of Burlington, Penobscot County, Maine from settlement to 1975. Along the Passadumkeag Vol. 1. Augusta, ME: The Kennebec Journal 1977. Pages 1–264 with index. 
Alan H. Hawkins, editor. The Mattanawcook Observer: a magazine of local history and genealogy of Lincoln, Maine and surrounding towns.  Falmouth Foreside, Me.: The Mattanawcook Observer. Series of three volumes of magazine published from 1982 to 1985.

External links
Town of Burlington official website

Towns in Penobscot County, Maine
Towns in Maine